Ngamau Mere Munokoa  (born 13 August 1944), also known as "Aunty Mau", is a Cook Islands politician and former Cabinet Minister.  She was the third woman ever elected to the Cook Islands Parliament, the second appointed to Cabinet, and the first to hold the post of Cook Islands Deputy Prime Minister. She is a member of the Cook Islands Democratic Party.

Early life
Munokoa was born in Rarotonga and attended Arorangi, Avarua and Nikao Primary schools and Tereora College. She trained for clerical work in Auckland, New Zealand in the hope of becoming a teacher, but returned to the Cook Islands in 1962 to open a shop.

Political career
Munokoa first ran for Parliament in 1994, but was unsuccessful. She was elected in the 1996 Nikao–Panama by-election, defeating then-Cook Islands Party candidate Tina Browne. In 1999 she was appointed as Minister of Internal Affairs and Works in the Cabinet of Sir Terepai Maoate. She later served in the Cabinet of Robert Woonton, and in 2003 was appointed Deputy Prime Minister, becoming the first Cook Islands woman to hold the position.  She later resigned from Woonton's Cabinet following his decision to form a coalition with the rival Cook Islands Party, but was reappointed in 2005 by Jim Marurai. She continued to serve in Cabinet, holding various portfolios, until December 2009, when she resigned over the sacking of Democratic Party leader Terepai Maoate.

She was re-elected at the 2010 election, and again in 2014. She failed to be re-elected in the 2018 election, losing to Vaine Mokoroa. Her 22 year career made her the longest-serving female MP.

Recognition
Munokoa was appointed Officer of the Order of the British Empire (OBE) in the 2010 New Year Honours. In October 2019, she was inducted into the hall of fame at the inaugural Vaine Rangatira awards for Cook Islands women.

References

Living people
1944 births
Members of the Parliament of the Cook Islands
Officers of the Order of the British Empire
People from Rarotonga
Democratic Party (Cook Islands) politicians
Cook Island businesspeople
Cook Island Māori people
20th-century New Zealand women politicians
20th-century New Zealand politicians
21st-century New Zealand women politicians
21st-century New Zealand politicians
Women government ministers of the Cook Islands
Deputy Prime Ministers of the Cook Islands
Agriculture ministers of the Cook Islands
Environment ministers of the Cook Islands
Interior ministers of the Cook Islands
Justice ministers of the Cook Islands
Labour ministers of the Cook Islands